Sanjoy Banerjee is an American chemical engineer, currently CUNY Distinguished Professor at City University of New York and formerly Westinghouse Professor at McMaster University.

References

Year of birth missing (living people)
Living people
City University of New York faculty
American chemical engineers
University of Waterloo alumni